Ballandean is a rural town and locality in the Southern Downs Region, Queensland, Australia.

Ballandean is in the Granite Belt Region of the Southern Downs. It is on the Queensland border with New South Wales. The town has a number of nearby vineyards which attracted tourists to the area.

Geography
The Severn River marks part of the northern boundary. Kelvin Grove Creek, Washpool Creek, Accommodation Creek and Smiths Creek all flow through Ballandean into the Severn River.

The New England Highway passes through Ballandean from north to south in the north-east of Ballandean in close parallel to the Southern railway line. The Ballandean railway station is in this area and the urban development surrounds the railway station. The station is now closed as there are no passenger services on this line. The rest of the locality is predominantly farmland.

Apple Vale is a neighbourhood in the north of the locality.

History

The name Ballandean derives from the name of a pastoral run, belonging to Henry Hayter Nicol in 1841, believed to be linked to his childhood association with Ballindean House, near Inchture, Perthshire, Scotland.

The town was surveyed and officially named in 1872.

Thomas Henry Fletcher built the Britannia Inn in the same year which attracted other businesses to the area. Fletcher went on to establish the first commercial orchard on the Granite Belt.Ballandean Post Office opened on 1 January 1873.

Land in Ballandean was open for selection on 17 April 1877;  were available.

Ballandean State School opened on 18 January 1909 under head teacher Frances Emily Wallace.

Apple Vale State School opened on 19 February 1914. Somme State School opened circa 1917. In 1924 the two schools became half-time schools in conjunction with Somme State School in Somme (meaning the two schools shared a single teacher). Both schools closed in August 1927. Apple Vale State School was on the south-west corner of Sundown Road and Mcmeniman Road. 

St Oswald's Anglican Church was dedicated on 1 March 1926 by Archbishop Gerald Sharp. Although it has now closed, the church building is still located at 12 Bents Road.

Heritage listings 

Ballandean has a number of heritage-listed sites, including:
  south-west of Ballandean: Ballandean Homestead

Education 
Ballandean State School is a government primary (Prep-6) school for boys and girls at Bent's Road. In 2018, the school had an enrolment of 40 students with 5 teachers (4 full-time equivalent) and 6 non-teaching staff (3 full-time equivalent).

Attractions
The man-made Ballandean Pyramid was constructed by Ken Stubberfield as a way to dispose of excess granite on his farm and is an unusual sight in Queensland.

The Balladean railway station is a well-known landmark on the New England Highway due to the big dinosaur in front of it, nicknamed the Fruitisforus (Fruit-is-for-us). The dinosaur was originally constructed for a float in the 1998 Apple and Grape Festival. After the festival, the community placed it in front of the railway station to get passing traffic to stop and buy fruit for a community fundraiser. It proved so popular that it was reinforced with fibregrass and painted and made a permanent roadside feature.

References

External links

 
Towns in Queensland
Southern Downs Region
1872 establishments in Australia
Populated places established in 1872
Localities in Queensland